Glyphipterix hologramma is a species of sedge moth in the genus Glyphipterix. It was described by Edward Meyrick in 1920. It is found in Brazil.

References

Moths described in 1920
Glyphipterigidae
Moths of South America